Yockey may refer to:

People
 Chauncey W. Yockey (1879–1936), American politician
 Hubert Yockey (1916–2016), American information theorist
 Francis Parker Yockey (1917–1960), American far-right political author
 Marcia Yockey (1923–2000), American weathercaster
 Ross Yockey (1943–2008), American author and historian
Jackie Mitchum-Yockey, one time president and CEO of High Adventure Ministries
 Jim Yockey, member of the Malvern High School (Ohio, United States) Athletic Hall of Fame 
 Josh Yockey, among the first employees of the American company Newsvine

Places
 Yockey, Indiana, a small town in the United States